Marokhy Ndione (born 4 November 1999) is a Swedish footballer who plays for Danish Superliga club Viborg FF.

Club career

IF Elsborg
Ndione came to Sweden at a young age. He started his career at Borås AIK and later joined IF Elfsborg, but had to leave the club at the age of 15 because he wasn't good enough. He returned to his childhood club, Borås AIK, and after one season, where he scored four goals in seven games in Division 3 for Borås' first team, Ndione returned to IF Elfsborg. After being acclaimed top scorer in the U-17 (23 goals) and U-19 (21 goals) leagues in Sweden in 2016 and 2017, Ndione signed a three-year contract in January 2018 with Elfsborg and was promoted to the senior squad.

In his first season in the senior team, he didn't get any playing time. He made his official debut on 23 February 2019. With 20 minutes left in the Swedish Cup game against IK Frej, Ndione came on from the bench and made his debut. About a month and a half later, he also got his Allsvenskan debut against Hammarby IF on 1 April 2019. 

In February 2020, Ndione extended his Elfsborg contract by three years. On 3 September 2020, Ndione was loaned out to Superettan club Örgryte IS in a cooperation agreement, allowing him to represent both clubs in the autumn of 2020.

Returning to Elfsborg for the 2021 season, he made 22 appearances in Allsvenskan and scored five goals.

Viborg FF
On 14 January 2022, Ndione joined Danish Superliga club Viborg FF on a deal until June 2025.

Personal life
Ndione was born in Sweden, and is of Senegalese descent.

References

External links 
 
  

1999 births
Living people
Swedish footballers
Swedish expatriate footballers
Swedish people of Senegalese descent
Association football forwards
IF Elfsborg players
Örgryte IS players
Viborg FF players
Allsvenskan players
Superettan players
Division 3 (Swedish football) players
Swedish expatriate sportspeople in Denmark
Expatriate men's footballers in Denmark